Hemp Bound: Dispatches from the Front Lines of the Next Agricultural Revolution is a 2014 book about hemp by Doug Fine. Kirkus Reviews said it was "A short, sweet, logical and funny argument for the potential of one of the world’s most dynamic cash crops." Boulder Weekly called it "a great addition to the literature surrounding a once-mainstay U.S. agricultural product". Reason said the book "is far from polemical or proselytizing. . . a narrative journey that includes visits with farmers, scientists, engineers, entrepreneurs, and politicians".

See also
List of books about cannabis

References

Further reading

External links
Author discussion, C-SPAN, April 10, 2014: "he discusses the reincorporation of hemp into the U.S. economy ... [and] profiles people around the country who were perfecting new uses for the hemp plant in anticipation of federal legalization"
King Hemp: Could marijuana's non-psychoactive counterpart be the next cash crop?, author interview, Santa Fe Reporter, November 18, 2014

2012 non-fiction books
American books about cannabis
Cannabis in California
Non-fiction books about cannabis
Chelsea Green Publishing books